Thern Promontory is a high, ice-covered promontory, 2,220 m, forming a westward projection at the south end of Eisenhower Range, about 7 nautical miles (13 km) west of Mount Nansen, in Victoria Land, Antarctica. Named by Advisory Committee on Antarctic Names (US-ACAN) for Michael G. Thern, station engineer at McMurdo Station with the 1965-66 summer party and the 1967 winter party.

Promontories of Antarctica
Landforms of Victoria Land
Scott Coast